Night snake may refer to:
 Hypsiglena, a snake genus
 Hypsiglena torquata, a species within this genus